Raymond Sanders "Ray" Watson  (24 December 1922 – 26 October 2010) was an Australian judge of the Family Court. He was one of the authors of the Family Law Act.
 
Watson was born in Penrith, Sydney to a road contractor, and received sporadic education. He worked for the New South Wales transport department in order to put himself through high school, attending Penrith High School, and studied law at the University of Sydney, although his study was interrupted by service in the navy during World War II. He survived a kamikaze attack on HMAS Australia in 1944. Just after the war, Watson lived in Austinmer with his wife and son and ran as a Liberal candidate for Werriwa in the 1946 federal election, running on a platform of housing affordability.  He gained 27,000 votes in that election.  Watson represented the seat of Georges River in the 1947 state election.  By 1949, he had had a second child and moved to Kirrawee, again running for election in the 1949 federal election.

Watson was an avid stamp collector his entire life.  He attended the local Methodist Church and became a preacher there.

Watson's first wife, Alison, with whom he had four children, died in 1968.

Watson became a barrister and advised the Commonwealth government as part of a committee on the reform of the Matrimonial Clauses Act 1956, which eventually became the Family Law Act 1975.  He rose to sit as a judge on the first Family Court in the 1970s, where he advocated the priority of children's welfare and no-fault divorce.

In 1984, a bomb attack on their home injured Watson and killed his second wife Pearl. On 29 July 2015, 68-year-old Leonard John Warwick was arrested by detectives at Campbelltown, New South Wales over the murder of Pearl, and three other Family Court related murders between 1980 and 1985, including the shooting death of fellow judge David Opas. On 23 July 2020, Warwick was found guilty of the murder of Pearl, Opas and another bombing murder. He was also found guilty of numerous other offences including other bomb incidents.

Watson was contributing to legal books until he suffered a series of strokes and a brain haemorrhage in July 2003, which impacted on his mental acuity, and on 19 October 2003 he suffered head injuries in a fall and was taken to Royal North Shore Hospital.

His third wife, Esme, died in 2009.

Watson died on 26 October 2010.

Publications

References

1922 births
2010 deaths
Members of the Order of Australia
Judges of the Family Court of Australia
University of Sydney alumni
Sydney Law School alumni
Royal Australian Navy personnel of World War II